Geelong East was an electoral district of the Legislative Assembly in the Australian state of Victoria from 1859 to 1985. It was located south of the city of Geelong, defined in the Victorian Electoral Act, 1858 as:

Geelong East (along with Electoral district of Geelong West) was created when the four-member Electoral district of Geelong was abolished in 1859. Geelong West and Geelong East were abolished in 1877, replaced by a re-created 3-member district of Geelong.

After the Electoral district of Bellarine was abolished in 1976, Geelong East was re-created. In 1985, population increases caused another redrawing of electoral boundaries; Geelong East was abolished and Bellarine re-created that year. Graham Ernst, last member for Geelong East, represented Bellarine 1985–1992.

Members

Kernot went on to represent the re-created Geelong from 1877.

Election results

References

Former electoral districts of Victoria (Australia)
1859 establishments in Australia
1976 establishments in Australia
1877 disestablishments in Australia
1985 disestablishments in Australia